Enodden is a village in the municipality of Midtre Gauldal in Trøndelag county, Norway. Enodden was the administrative center of the former municipality of Budal which existed from 1879 until 1974. Budal Church is located in Enodden.

References

Midtre Gauldal
Villages in Trøndelag